Akasa Kusum is a 2008 Sri Lankan Sinhala drama film directed by Prasanna Vithanage and co-produced by H.D. Premasiri, Prasanna Vithanage, and A. Sreekar Prasad for Sarasavi Cineroo Films. It stars Malini Fonseka and Nimmi Harasgama in lead roles along with Dilhani Ekanayake and Kaushalya Fernando. Music composed by Lakshman Joseph de Saram.

Filming starts on 23 December 2007 in Colombo. It received a world premiere at the Pusan International Film Festival in October 2008, and won numerous awards at various other festivals.

The film was released in Sri Lanka on 21 August 2009, and became a box-office hit in that country. It was also Sri Lanka's initial entry to the 2010 Academy Awards for Best Foreign Language Film, but was replaced by Alimankada. In May 2009, American film distribution company, Wonderphil Productions granted international distribution rights for the film.

Plot
Sandhya Rani (Malini) is an aging film star who was once the darling of the silver screen. Having lost fame and fortune in a changing world, she now lives quietly in obscurity. She ekes out a living by renting out a room in her home to the young film and television stars of today to satisfy their illicit sexual desires, and by selling dumplings.

Rani is introduced to Shalika (Dilhani), a popular film actress, when she decides to carry on her affair with a co-star past shooting. Shalika's husband discovers this, and the scandal and publicity brings Rani and Shalika closer as friends. Rani is invited to a media program on television, as a backup, and after the interview, her profile raises again.

Priya Gunaratne (Nimmi), is a woman in her mid-20s, who happens to be two months pregnant, unmarried, HIV-positive, and is employed at a karaoke night club. It is a tough life, but she is able to develop a friendship with another hostess named Bunty (Samanalee).

Shalika tries getting in touch with Udith (Pubudu), her former costar and current lover, with the hopes that he will continue their relationship, but he decides to callously end things over the phone. Rani commiserates with Shalika by exploring her industry affair and the patriarchy inherent in the entertainment industry. Their conversation inspires confidence in Shalika; the next day she calls a magazine to announce that she will start working in teledramas. This opens more work opportunities and includes Rani in the teledrama.

Priya sees a clip from the serial on the bar's television right before a fight between a regular client and an aggressive new client breaks out. Rani receives a call from the Colpetty police station with the message that a girl from a bar fight said that Rani was her mother. Rani responds, "The whole country knows I was never married." Priya is bitter about her childhood abandonment and makes it known to her mother that she still exists and that Rani is responsible for her present plight.

After the phone call and brief visit, Rani is visibly shaken. Shalika asks what is wrong, and Rani explains that she was discovered when her father worked as a light man in a studio. The owner noticed Rani and insisted that she start working in the industry. However, Rani was already married and had a year old daughter, and the studio could only work with a "virgin" star. Rani eventually separates from her husband and daughter, who were also paid off to leave.

Once this secret is no longer one, Rani decides to go to the karaoke bar to find Priya. Priya drives her away, further emotionally isolating herself. She asks Bunty to move in together and help raise the unborn baby. Rani continues looking for Priya, visiting the bar and even Bunty's apartment.

Priya goes to the hospital and starts writing long extensive letters to Rani about her experiences growing up without her mother and with an alcoholic father. In the end Priya passes and Rani becomes the caretaker of Priya's baby girl.

Cast
 Malini Fonseka as Sandhya Rani
 Nimmi Harasgama as Priya
 Dilhani Ekanayake as Shalika
 Samanalee Fonseka as Bunty
 Kaushalya Fernando as Mallika, Sandhya's sister
 Sanduni Fonseka as Teenage Sandhya Rani
 Jayani Senanayake as Leela
 Nirosha Perera as TV presenter
 Dayadeva Edirisinghe as Police Inspector
 Upeksha Swarnamali as Film actress
 Kumara Thirimadura as Karaoke client
 Thusitha Laknath
 Suraj Mapa
 Pubudu Chathuranga

Music
The original music for Akasa Kusum was composed by Lakshman Joseph De Saram. The original soundtrack (OST) was also made into a promotional music video.

Release
The film was released in Sri Lanka on 21 August 2009 and ran over 77 days across 24 screens in the country. It also received a limited release in Singapore from 18 June 2010, at Sinema Old School.

Accolades

 Silver Peacock Award (Best Actress – Malini Fonseka), Indian International Film Festival (IFFF), India
 Best Actress – Malini Fonseka, Levante International Film Festival, Italy
 Jury Special Mention Award, Vesoul Asian Film Festival, France
 Best Asian Film (NETPAC) Award – Granada Cinesdelsur Film Festival, Spain

'Akasa Kusum was originally Sri Lanka’s official entry for Best Foreign Language Film to the Academy Awards (Oscars) in 2010.  It was replaced by Alimankada.

Official selections
 Pusan International Film Festival, Korea (World Premiere) 
 Brisbane International Film Festival, Australia
 Nominee, International Federation of Film Critics (FIPRESCI) Award
 Asia Pacific Screen Awards, Australia
 Nominee, Best Actress Malini Fonseka
 International Film Festival of Kerala, India
 Palm Springs International Film Festival, United States
 Singapore International Film Festival, Singapore
 London Asian Film Festival, United Kingdom

References

External links
 Official site
 

2008 films
2000s Sinhala-language films
2008 drama films
Films shot in Sri Lanka
Films directed by Prasanna Vithanage
Films produced by Prasanna Vithanage
Films with screenplays by Prasanna Vithanage
Sri Lankan drama films